Martin de Porres Bartel  (born 1955) is an American Benedictine monk and Catholic priest, elected in 2020 to serve as the twelfth Archabbot of Saint Vincent Archabbey in Latrobe, Pennsylvania.

Born on November 14, 1955, in Barberton, Ohio, Bartel made his simple profession of vows as a monk of Saint Vincent Archabbey on July 10, 1980, solemn profession of vows on July 11, 1983, and was ordained a priest on May 25, 1985, by Bishop William G. Connare of the Diocese of Greensburg. On June 23, 2020, he was elected archabbot to succeed Douglas Robert Nowicki. His abbatial motto is "Brothers together as one", from Psalm 132/133. Previously, Bartel had served as pastor of several parishes in the Diocese of Pittsburgh and the Diocese of Greensburg. He previously served as the President of Saint Vincent College from 1995 to 2000, and also sat on the board of directors of Serra Catholic High School in McKeesport, Pennsylvania.

References

1955 births
Living people
Saint Vincent College
Catholic Church in Pennsylvania
Roman Catholic Diocese of Greensburg
Benedictine abbots
People from Barberton, Ohio
Roman Catholic Ecclesiastical Province of Philadelphia
American Benedictines
American Roman Catholic priests
Religious leaders from Ohio